The Imperial Hotel & Restaurant is a bed and breakfast located in Amador City, California in the United States.

History

The Imperial Hotel was founded in 1879 by the Sanguinetti family. It was first a store, before B. Sanguinetti made it into a hotel. It was originally named the Italian Hotel. It was also called the Ben White Hotel. Its main clientele were people visiting as part of the California Gold Rush, specifically wealthy miners. A two floor hotel, the hotel was upstairs and the restaurant and bar were on the ground floor. Eventually, an extension was built for more hotel rooms in the back. The building went into disuse by 1927. It was sold and renovated in 1968.

The building was bought by Dale Martin and Bruce Sherrill in 1988. They made it into a bed and breakfast. In 2006, the Imperial was bought by the McCamant family. They own and operate the Imperial Hotel as a bed and breakfast today. Ghost hunters believe that the Imperial Hotel is haunted with ghosts. The ghosts that people claim to have seen and heard include a cowboy, a young woman (called the "White Lady") and the sound of footsteps.

Facilities

The hotel is two stories and is made out of stone and brick. The walls "are twelve bricks thick at its base and four bricks thick at the roof." The layout remains the same as it did historically: guest rooms are upstairs and on the ground floor is the restaurant and bar. The area that served as guest rooms in the back on the ground floor now serves as a patio for dining. The restaurant specializes in California cuisine made from local and sustainable farmers and producers. It sits 55 people. The bar is called the Oasis. Guests can stay at the main building, or at a property on another part of town in an area called God's Hill. That property was owned by the former foreman of Keystone Mine. The God's Hill house has larger rooms than the original inn. There is a library on site offering guests books and magazines. The hotel is primarily decorated in Victorian era antiques.
A bridge replacement project completed in 2014 has beautified and revitalized the center of the city, providing patio dining at the Imperial Hotel.

References

Bed and breakfasts in California
Reportedly haunted locations in California
Buildings and structures in Amador County, California
1879 establishments in California